Nate Hinze (born June 12, 1988) is an American Paralympic wheelchair basketball player from Sheboygan, Wisconsin. He is a three-time Intercollegiate Wheelchair Basketball Champion and is 2010 IWBF World Championship bronze medalist. A year later, he was awarded a gold medal at the 2011 Parapan American Games and on 2012 Summer Paralympics he was awarded with another bronze medal. Besides playing sports he also likes to watch them with his favorite teams being the Green Bay Packers, Milwaukee Brewers and Wisconsin Badgers. He also likes to play videogames and jet ski. Currently he lives in Cedar Grove, Wisconsin and is a fan of Green Bay Packers and Michael Jordan.

References

External links
 
 

1988 births
Living people
American men's wheelchair basketball players
Paralympic wheelchair basketball players of the United States
Paralympic bronze medalists for the United States
Paralympic medalists in wheelchair basketball
Medalists at the 2012 Summer Paralympics
Medalists at the 2020 Summer Paralympics
Wheelchair basketball players at the 2012 Summer Paralympics
Sportspeople from Sheboygan, Wisconsin
People from Cedar Grove, Wisconsin
Medalists at the 2011 Parapan American Games
21st-century American people